Enn Kasak (born on 24 September 1954 Navi, Võru County) is an Estonian philosopher and astrophysicist.

1981 he graduated from University of Tartu in astrophysics speciality. 1981-1995 he worked at Tõravere Observatory. 1998-2007 he taught at Tallinn University. Since 2007 he is teaching at Tartu University.

1995–1997 he was the head of Võro Institute.

In 2001 he was awarded with Order of the White Star, medal class.

Works

Fiction
 "Mu kadonu tii" Vikerkaar, 7-8/2005, pp 97–100
 "Trooja hopõn" Vikerkaar, 7-8/2005, pp 100–110
 "Partii" Võro-Seto tähtraamat 2009, pp 66–68. Võro: Võro Selts VKKF, 2008
 novel "Vaba pattulangemise seadus" Tallinn: Argo, 2009. ISBN 9789949438594

References

Living people
1954 births
Estonian philosophers
Estonian astrophysicists
Recipients of the Order of the White Star, Medal Class
University of Tartu alumni
Academic staff of the University of Tartu
Academic staff of Tallinn University
People from Võru Parish